The Lebanese national ball hockey team is the national ball hockey team of Lebanon. The team is controlled by the Lebanese Hockey Association and a member of the International Street and Ball Hockey Federation (ISBHF).

History
The Lebanese Hockey Association has been created to advance ice, inline and ball hockey initiatives of Lebanese hockey players on a worldwide basis in addition to enabling international development and representation of the country in the sport of hockey.

Lebanon will make its Ball Hockey World Championship (BHWC) debut at the 2017 Ball Hockey World Championship in Pardubice, Czech Republic. The team played its first game on 2 June 2017, but a narrow 2–1 loss against Great Britain, then later lost 3–2 to Bermuda in their second game on 3 June 2017.

World Championship

Roster
The following 25 players have been selected for the 2017 Ball Hockey World Championship.

All-time World Championship record

See also
Lebanon men's national ice hockey team

References

External links

Ball hockey
Ball hockey